Youssef Kalfa (born 14 May 1993) is a Syrian professional footballer who currently plays for Al-Taliya, and the Syrian national football team.

Career

2018–19
He started the season with Al-Hazem and he was key player in the team. But he decided to move to Al-Qadsiah FC in the middle of the season for personal reasons.

International career
Kalfa made his first senior international appearance in a friendly in and against Tajikistan on 27 August 2016, having substituted Hamid Mido in the 56th minute.

He was part of 6 matches in 2018 FIFA World Cup qualification.

He participated in 2019 AFC Asian Cup and he was part of the first two matches against Palestine and Jordan.

International goals
Scores and results list Syria's goal tally first.

Honours
Al-Jaish
Syrian Premier League (1): 2015–16

References

External links
 

1993 births
Living people
Syrian footballers
Association football midfielders
Syria international footballers
Taliya SC players
Al-Nasr SC (Kuwait) players
Emirates Club players
Al-Hazem F.C. players
Al-Qadsiah FC players
Al-Arabi SC (Kuwait) players
Al-Fahaheel FC players
UAE Pro League players
Saudi Professional League players
Syrian expatriate sportspeople in Kuwait
Syrian expatriate sportspeople in the United Arab Emirates
Syrian expatriate sportspeople in Saudi Arabia
Expatriate footballers in Kuwait
Expatriate footballers in the United Arab Emirates
Expatriate footballers in Saudi Arabia
2019 AFC Asian Cup players
Syrian Premier League players
Kuwait Premier League players
Al-Wahda SC (Syria) players